Burnin is a studio album by American singer-songwriter Patti LaBelle. It was released by MCA Records on October 1, 1991, in the United States. The album features several collaborations, including duets with Gladys Knight and Michael Bolton, and a reunion track with Nona Hendryx and Sarah Dash from Labelle. It yielded three Billboard R&B chart hits: "Feels Like Another One", "Somebody Loves You Baby (You Know Who It Is)" and "When You've Been Blessed (Feels Like Heaven)".  Critical reviews were mixed: Entertainment Weekly gave it a B+, while the Los Angeles Times ranked it 2.5 stars out of 5, noting a reduction of LaBelle's usual intensity.

The album, released on CD, LP, and cassette, was certified Gold in April 1992 by the Recording Industry Association of America for sales in excess of 500,000 copies. It reached number 71 on the Billboard 200 and number 13 on Top R&B/Hip-Hop Albums. The title track Burnin won the Grammy Award for Best Female R&B Vocal Performance at the 1992 ceremony, jointly with a single by Lisa Fischer. In 1992, LaBelle released her first solo live album, simply titled Live!, featuring several songs from Burnin as it was recorded during this album's promotional tour.

Under the pseudonym "Paisley Park", Prince co-wrote the song "I Hear Your Voice" along with his vocalist collaborator Rosie Gaines and her husband Francis Jules. Prince helped produce the track.  The album track "Temptation", B-side of the fourth single released from the album, "When You Love Somebody (I'm Saving My Love for You)", was written by Cuban-American singer Martika, who originally released it on her album Martika's Kitchen.

Critical reception 
Dave Obee from Calgary Herald wrote, "Not only is she on fire, she`s lighting matches and tossing them in all directions. Many hit gravel and quickly burn out. Look out, though, for the ones that touch anything flammable. Consider the song "I Don't Do Duets", a duet - huh? - with Gladys Knight. Listen as two of the strongest, most soulful and experienced voices turn a fair-to-average song into a R&B masterpiece. It's no surprise that La Belle couldn't keep the heat turned up at that level for the entire disc, but the best stuff here - the Knight song and a duet with Michael Bolton - more than makes up for its weak moments."

Track listing 

Notes
  denotes co-producer
  denotes associate producer
The single mix of "Feels Like Another One" features rap by Big Daddy Kane.
"Temptation" is a bonus track for CD and cassette. "Crazy Love" is a bonus track for CD and LP. As of 2012, both tracks are available for digital download.

Personnel 
 Patti LaBelle – lead vocals, additional vocal arrangements (1), backing vocals (3, 4), choir arrangements (6)
 Clinton Stokes III – keyboards (1, 5)
 Michael Stokes – keyboards (1, 5), keyboard programming (1), drum programming (1), arrangements (1, 5), rhythm arrangements (5), horn arrangements (5), BGV arrangements (5)
 David Ervin – synthesizers (1), keyboards (5), keyboard programming (5), drum programming (5)
 Darren Floyd – synthesizers (1), keyboard programming (1, 5), drum programming (1, 5), keyboards (5)
 Eugene Curry – keyboards (2, 7)
 Nathaniel Wilkie – keyboards (3, 6, 10), synthesizer programming (3, 6, 10)
 James Budd Ellison – arrangements (3, 6, 10), keyboards (6, 10), choir arrangements (6)
 Vernon Fails – keyboards (4, 12)
 Greg Phillinganes – acoustic piano (4, 12)
 David Ward – keyboard programming (4, 12), drum programming (4)
 Walter Afanasieff – keyboards (9), synthesizers (9), synth bass (9), drums (9), percussion (9)
 Louis Biancaniello – programming (9)
 Ren Klyce – programming (9)
 John Anthony – samples (10)
 David Hampton – technical support and cartage (11)
 Robert Palmer – additional programming (11)
 Wah Wah Watson – guitars (1, 5)
 Joe Marioni – guitars (2, 7)
 Randy Bowland – guitar (3, 10), acoustic guitar (3)
 Michael J. Powell – guitars (4, 12), drums (4), percussion (4, 12)
 Chris Camozzi – guitars (9)
 Milton "Pocket" Honroe – guitar overdubs (11)
 Al Turner – bass (4)
 Freddie Washington – bass overdubs (11)
 Nathan East – bass (12)
 John Paris – drums (10)
 John Robinson – drums (12)
 Quinton Joseph – percussion (2, 7), drum programming (7)
 Terral Santiel – percussion overdubs (11)
 Ernie Fields Jr. – saxophones (1, 5)
 Pamela Williams – saxophone (10)
 George Bohanon – trombone (1, 5)
 Raymond Lee Brown – trumpet (1, 5)
 Nolan Smith – trumpet (1, 5)
 Jack Faith – horn and string orchestrations (3)
 Paul Riser – string arrangements (12)
 Big Daddy Kane – rap (1)
 Dee Harvey – backing vocals (1, 5)
 Rick Nelson – backing vocals (1, 5)
 Linda Stokes – backing vocals (1, 5)
 Lisa Taylor – backing vocals (1, 5)
 Annette Hardeman – backing vocals (2, 7)
 Charlene Holloway – backing vocals (2, 7)
 Paula Holloway – backing vocals (2, 7)
 Bunny Sigler – backing vocals (2, 7), vocal arrangements (2, 7), choir arrangements (6)
 Tawatha Agee – backing vocals (3)
 Lisa Fischer – backing vocals (3)
 Paulette McWilliams – backing vocals (3)
 Fonzi Thornton – backing vocals (3), vocal contractor (3)
 Luther Vandross – backing vocals (3), BGV arrangements (3)
 Brenda White King – backing vocals (3)
 Gladys Knight – lead and backing vocals (4)
 Valerie Pinkston-Mayo – backing vocals (4)
 Fred White – backing vocals (4)
 The Wilmington/Chester Mass Choir – choir (6)
 Rev. Ernest Davis Jr. – choir director (6)
 Michael Bolton – lead vocals (9)
 LaBelle – backing vocals (10)
 The Harmonettes – backing vocals (11)
 Sami McKinney – vocal arrangements (11)

Production 
 Patti LaBelle – executive producer 
 James Budd Ellison – associate producer (1), recording supervisor 
 Eugene Curry – co-producer (2)
 Edward Leak – assistant producer (3)
 Nathaniel Wilkie – associate producer (3, 6, 10), co-producer (7)
 Michael Stokes – co-producer (8, 11)
 Frank Byron Clark – recording (1, 5), mixing (1, 5, 8)
 Jim Gallagher – recording (2, 7)
 Scott MacMinn – recording (2, 7)
 Ray Bardani – recording (3, 6)
 Milton Chan – recording (4), assistant engineer (4, 12)
 David Ward – recording (4, 12)
 Michael Koppleman – recording (8)
 Dana Chappelle – recording (9)
 Khaliq Glover – recording (12)
 Warren Wood – recording (12)
 Mike Tarsia – mixing (2, 3, 6, 7, 10), recording (3, 6, 10)
 Barney Perkins – mixing (4, 12), recording (12)
 Michael J. Powell – mixing (4, 12)
 Mick Guzauski – mixing (9)
 Jeff Lorenzen – mixing (12)
 Foley Fali – assistant engineer (1, 5, 8)
 Clinton Stokes III – assistant engineer (1, 5)
 Frank McNulty – assistant engineer (2, 3, 6, 7, 10)
 Tom Greto – assistant engineer (3, 6, 10)
 Robert H. – assistant engineer (3, 6, 10)
 Paul Rinis – assistant engineer (3, 6, 10)
 Brian Wittmer – assistant engineer (3, 6, 10)
 Paul D. Allen – assistant engineer (4, 12)
 Manny LaCarrubba – assistant engineer (9)
 Devon Riteveld – assistant engineer (9)
 Bernie Grundman – mastering 
 Vartan Kurjian – art direction 
 John Coulter – design 
 Marc Raboy – photography 
 Armstaed Edwards – direction 

Studios
 Recorded at Blue Palm Studios (Burbank, CA); Creative Source Studios (Hollywood, CA); Larrabee Sound Studios (North Hollywood, CA); Record Plant (Sausalito, CA); The Hit Factory (New York, NY); Sigma Sound Studios (Philadelphia, PA); Paisley Park Studios (Minneapolis, MN); Vanguard Studios (Detroit, MI).
 Mixed at Creative Source Studios; Record Plant; Sigma Sound Studios; Elumba Studios (Los Angeles, CA); Encore Studios (Burbank, CA).
 Mastered at Bernie Grundman Mastering (Hollywood, CA).

Charts

Weekly charts

Year-end charts

Certifications

References

External links 

1991 albums
Patti LaBelle albums
albums produced by Walter Afanasieff
MCA Records albums
New jack swing albums